Portraits of Anarchists is a limited edition 6-song EP attached to the front of the book i-Portraits of Anarchists by Casey Orr. It features exclusive songs not available elsewhere.

"Nothing Knocks Me Over" is a remake of the song "Love Can Knock You Over" from Swingin' with Raymond.

Track listing
 "Don't Tip-Toe" (3:26)
 "Nothing Knocks Me Over" (3:05)
 "I Can Only Take/Give So Much" (2:31)
 "I Am Tradition & Tomorrow" (1:40)
 "Time After Time" (3:11)
 "You Grow Old" (3:24)

References

Chumbawamba albums
1996 debut EPs